The Tivoli Fountain is installed on the Washington State Capitol campus in Olympia, Washington, United States. Dedicated on April 15, 1953, the copper and cement fountain is a replica of the Roman-style fountain in Copenhagen's Tivoli Park.

References

1953 establishments in Washington (state)
1953 sculptures
Concrete sculptures in the United States
Copper sculptures in the United States
Fountains in Washington (state)
Outdoor sculptures in Olympia, Washington
Washington State Capitol campus